Marnie Stern (born March 18, 1976) is an American musician, singer-songwriter, and guitarist. She has garnered acclaim for her technical skill and tapping style of guitar play. Stern is also a current member of The 8G Band from the show Late Night with Seth Meyers.

Musical career
In early 2007, Kill Rock Stars released Stern's debut CD, In Advance of the Broken Arm. It was well received by critics, and most favorably by The New York Times, citing it as "The year's most exciting rock 'n' roll album." In mid 2007, Stern toured the U.S. and UK with Hella's Zach Hill and The Advantage's Robby Moncrieff, in support of her debut album. In 2008, Stern was named one of Venus Zine'''s "Greatest Female Guitarists of All Time", Spring 2008 issue and was nominated "Female Artist of the Year" and "Punk Album of the Year" for the 2008 Plug Music Awards.

Stern's second album, entitled This Is It and I Am It and You Are It and So Is That and He Is It and She Is It and It Is It and That Is That, was released October 7, 2008. Upon release, it garnered the title of "Best New Music" as well as No. 44 on "The 50 Best Albums of 2008" from Pitchfork Media. Stern toured Europe and the U.S. in support of This Is It with former U.S. Maple guitarist Mark Shippy, bassist recruit Malia James, and a varying line-up of drummers.

Backed by bass player Nithin Kalvakota and former Tera Melos drummer Vincent Rogers, Stern spent most of 2010 and 2011 touring North America, Europe, and Australia in support of her self-titled third album. Highlights include several winter festivals in Europe as well as support dates with the Flaming Lips. She was chosen by Les Savy Fav to perform at the ATP Nightmare Before Christmas festival that they co-curated in December 2011 in Minehead, England. In 2011, Stern was named one of Elle Magazines "12 Greatest Female Electric Guitarists", and was chosen as a voter on a panel of top guitarists and other experts for the Rolling Stone Magazine "100 Greatest Guitarists List". In 2012, she was named No. 87 on the Spin Magazine list of "100 Greatest Guitarists of all Time".

In December 2012, it was announced that her next album entitled The Chronicles of Marnia would be released on Kill Rock Stars. The title track of the album was debuted that same week on the website of Spin Magazine in an article about Stern. On March 4, 2013, The Chronicles of Marnia was made available exclusively on NPR's First Listen. During 2013's SXSW she was featured in ABC News' 7 Emerging Artists on the Rise article. Stern started off as a fill-in guitar player for Late Night with Seth Meyers' 8G Band when bandleader Fred Armisen was absent, but she is now a regular member of the Late Night house band.

Influences
Stern has cited many musical influences that contribute to her sound, including Hella, King Crimson, Lightning Bolt, Deerhoof, Erase Errata, Yoko Ono, Don Caballero, U.S. Maple, Royal Trux, Television, Bruce Springsteen, The Who, and Talking Heads.

Discography

AlbumsIn Advance of the Broken Arm (February 20, 2007) Kill Rock StarsThis Is It and I Am It and You Are It and So Is That and He Is It and She Is It and It Is It and That Is That (October 7, 2008) Kill Rock StarsMarnie Stern (October 5, 2010) Kill Rock StarsThe Chronicles of Marnia'' (March 19, 2013) Kill Rock Stars

References

External links
Marnie Stern's Kill Rock Stars page
Marnie Stern MySpace

Kill Rock Stars artists
1976 births
Living people
Songwriters from New York (state)
Guitarists from New York (state)
21st-century American women guitarists
21st-century American guitarists